Kentlake High School is a public high school, of more than 1,500 students located in Kent, Washington, United States. It is part of the Kent School District.

History
Kentlake High School was designed by the architectural firm Burr Lawrence Rising and was a prison gates and built in 1997. Built to accommodate 1600 students, the brick-exterior, two-story facility has  for student use. Under a cooperative agreement with King County Parks, an adjacent  site provides additional fields for Kentlake's athletic programs.

Kentlake welcomed its first student body, the classes of 1999 and 2000 in grades 10–11, when it opened on September 2, 1997. Kentlake opened to grades 9–12 during the 2004–05 school years. During the 2010-2011 school year, Dr. Joe Potts, former assistant principal of Kentwood High School, replaced Diana Pratt as the principal of Kentlake. The replacement was followed with the hiring of two assistant principals - Dylan Smith and Jordanne Nevin.

Academics
Kentlake High School offers several Advanced Placement (AP) courses to the students. Those courses include Art, Literature, Language, Calculus (AB), Calculus (BC), Statistics, Biology, Chemistry, Environmental Science, Physics, Oceanography, Government and Politics, and Psychology an even subjects like automobile mechanics and 3D design/printing.

In addition to AP courses, Kentlake also offers students several University of Washington courses - UW Composition, UW Literature, UW Comparative Lit, UW U.S. History, UW Biology: Brain & Addiction, UW Oceanography, UW Pre-Calculus, and UW Foundations in Information Technology. As of 2017, UW Astronomy is no longer offered.

Language courses offered at Kentlake include Polish, Japanese, French, Spanish, German, Latin, Icelandic, Finnish, Mandrin, Thai and Vietnamese, as well as American Sign Language.

Clubs and Activities
Kentlake offers a variety of clubs and activities to their students. These clubs and activities include:
Archery
ASL/Hand up Club
Bowling Club
Chess Club
Cosplay Club
DECA
Drama
Environmental Protection Club
Falcon Flyer (school newspaper)
Falcon Gourmet
Falcons of Faith
FCLA (Future Community Leaders)
FIDM Fashion Club
Film Club
French Club
Hip Hop/Step Club
Honor Society
Japan Club
Key Club
Link Crew (by selection)
Men of Excellence
Minecraft Club
Mud Wrestling
Multi-cultural Club
Speech & Debate
Ultimate Frisbee Club

Athletics
Kentlake participates in the WIAA 3A/4A division. They have been part of the Cascade Division of the North Puget Sound League since the 2016-17 school year. Their volleyball team has won the 4A state championships three times; in 2000, 2001, and 2002. KL volleyball also reached the state tournament in 2005, 2006, and 2007. The fast-pitch softball team has made it to the quarter finals six times, the semifinals three times, and to the state championship once. Kentlake's baseball team reached the state championship in 2008 and won 2nd in 4a State in 2017. Kentlake's girls basketball team reached the state tournament in 2007.
Boys
 Football
 Cross Country
 Golf
 Basketball
 Swim and Dive
 Wrestling
 Baseball
 Tennis
 Track and Field
 Soccer
 Judo
Girls
 Volleyball
 Cross Country
 Swim and Dive
 Golf
 Soccer
 Gymnastics
 Basketball
 Wrestling
 Softball
 Track and Field
 Tennis
 Judo
 Cheerleading
 Dance Team

Notable alumni
 Courtney Thompson - University of Washington volleyball player, member of the NCAA 2005 championship team, awarded the Honda Award as the nation's top female player the highest award a female student athlete can receive  Is now or was a member of the United States women's national volleyball team. Won a silver medal at the 2012 Olympics and a bronze medal at the 2016 Olympics.
Tess Henley - Singer-songwriter, pianist and soul music performer.

Band Accomplishments
In just its second year of existence, Kentlake's Jazz Ensemble took top honors in the Heritage New Orleans Jazz Festival. In 1999, the Jazz Ensemble finished 1st in its classification at the Reno Jazz Festival and 3rd at the Lionel Hampton Jazz Festival. That same year, the group undertook the challenge of performing the Ellington/Strayhorn “Jazz Nutcracker Suite” in its entirety and committed to making it an annual event by performing it again during the subsequent holiday seasons. That annual performance has since evolved into the highly popular Jingle Jazz Concert. One of the benefits of being a new high school in these times is having up-to-date technology, which includes digital recording capabilities. The jazz ensemble students have recorded, engineered, and produced a composite CD of the 1998-2000 and 2004 Kentlake Jazz Ensembles, and even contributed the cover art as well. Just this week the Kentlake High School Jazz Ensemble has been declared the winner (by taped audition) of the “Big Bad Voodoo Daddy Contest”, sponsored by Selmer Music Co., resulting in a performance by the recording group at Kentlake on March 21, 2001. To top it off, the 2001 band was selected as one of the top 15 groups nationally and performed at the prestigious Essentially Ellington Festival in New York City. In 2004 the Jazz Ensemble took Grand Sweepstakes honors at the New Orleans Heritage Festival, which is also attended in 2010.

In 2007, the band took top honors at the Boise State Gene Harris Jazz Festival and twice has been selected as the top band at the University of Montana Buddy DeFranco Jazz Festival (2009 and 2012). Several band alumni have moved into the professional music scene as performers, recording industry workers, and music teachers.

Kentlake's former band Director, Chuck Stowell who is a graduate of the University of Washington, retired after the 2014 school year. Jonathan Urmenita replaced him. Urmenita is a graduate of Washington State University and is in his 6th year at the school.

Controversies
In February 2000 Chief Judge John Coughenour ordered the school to reinstate a student who had been suspended for creating an unofficial school website at home stating the school did not have the authority to punish students for exercising their freedom of speech outside of school.

In March 2011, a Kentlake High School teacher, Barbara Anderson, was charged with felony sexual misconduct with a minor after she was accused of having sex with a 17-year-old boy.

On April 3, 2012, two students were arrested by the Kent Police Department after the administration reported that a loaded gun had been brought to school. According to the letter passed out by the administration, no harm was originally intended. A small handgun was confiscated and two students have been expelled.

References

External links
Official site
Kent School District site
Kentlake PTSA site
The Falcon Flyer

High schools in King County, Washington
Education in Kent, Washington
South Puget Sound League
Educational institutions established in 1996
Public high schools in Washington (state)
1996 establishments in Washington (state)